Wildan Nezar Al-Nukhailawi (born 10 August 1986) is a Paralympian athlete from Iraq competing in the F41 classification throwing events. He won a bronze medal in the javelin at the 2012 Summer Paralympics in London and followed this four years later with a silver in the same event at the 2016 Games in Rio de Janeiro.

Athletics career
Nukhailawi represented Iraq at the 2012 Summer Paralympics, entering the shot put, discus and javelin throw. His best result was in the javelin, in which he finished third. Nukhailawi also competed for Iraq at three IPC Athletics World Championships, winning a silver medal in the javelin in 2011 in Christchurch. After the 2012 Paralympics, the International Paralympic Committee reclassified the F40 category, creating two new classifications. Nukhailawi was placed in the F41 classification from which he competed from 2013. It was in this category that he won the shot put gold medal at the 2014 Asian Para Games in Incheon.

Notes

Paralympic athletes of Iraq
Athletes (track and field) at the 2012 Summer Paralympics
Athletes (track and field) at the 2016 Summer Paralympics
Athletes (track and field) at the 2020 Summer Paralympics
Paralympic bronze medalists for Iraq
Paralympic silver medalists for Iraq
Living people
Medalists at the 2012 Summer Paralympics
Medalists at the 2016 Summer Paralympics
Medalists at the 2020 Summer Paralympics
Iraqi male javelin throwers
Iraqi male discus throwers
Iraqi male shot putters
Sportspeople from Baghdad
1986 births
Paralympic medalists in athletics (track and field)
Medalists at the 2014 Asian Para Games